Attune is a 2017 album by the Australian singer Lenka.

Attune may also refer to:

Musical tuning, concepts related to pitch and tone
Attunement, early term for "energy medicine", per Lloyd Arthur Meeker (1907–1954)
Attunement (German: Stimmung), the third class of experience ranked beneath will and reason per Heidegger
Attune Foods (est 1908), makers of cereals and the probiotic Attune bar
Attune, insurance company, subsidiary of AIG
Attune, consultancy, fashion industry subsidiary of MAS Holdings and SAP
Attune, horse which won Fleur De Lys Fillies' Stakes in 2004